Major-General Robert Charles Moss King  (1904 – 16 December 1983) was a British Army officer.

Military career
After graduating from the Royal Military College, Sandhurst, King was commissioned into the West Yorkshire Regiment on 30 January 1924. Eric Bols and Cecil Firbank were among his graduates, both also future major-generals.

He served in the Far East in the Second World War for which he was appointed a Companion of the Distinguished Service Order. After the war he became Commander of 17th Infantry Brigade in Germany in December 1946, deputy director of Military Operations at the War Office in February 1953 and General Officer Commanding 44th (Home Counties) Division in January 1954. His last appointment was as Director of Quartering at the War Office in February 1957 before retiring in April 1959.

He died on 16 December 1983.

References

External links
Generals of World War II

1904 births
1983 deaths
British Army major generals
Companions of the Order of the Bath
Companions of the Distinguished Service Order
Officers of the Order of the British Empire
West Yorkshire Regiment officers
British Army brigadiers of World War II
Graduates of the Royal Military College, Sandhurst